"Your Best Friend" is the single by Japanese singer-songwriter Mai Kuraki. It was released on 19 October 2011 through Northern Music, as the third single from her tenth studio album Over the Rainbow. The song served as the theme song to the Japanese animated television series Case Closed.

Information
"Your Best Friend" is the 40th ending theme for Detective Conan. "Step by Step" is the official theme song for the Mie Prefecture-based Nemu no Sato Hotel and Resort.

Both songs were written and arranged by Kuraki and Giorgio "Giorgio 13" Cancemi from the R&B duo So' Fly. Cancemi, a Japanese-Italian, is also behind the song "Doshite Sukinandaro", a song by Cancemi's solo project Nerdhead (on Universal Music Japan label), which featured Kuraki on vocals.

Music video and radio airplay
This song was launched on Space Shower TV and bayfm Chiba two weeks before its official release.

Track listing

Charts

Weekly charts

Monthly charts

Yearly charts

Release history

See also
 Mai Kuraki discography
 Case Closed discography

References

External links
 Mai Kuraki Official Website
 
 Your Best Friend (CD Only) on CD Japan
 Your Best Friend (DualDisc) on CD Japan
 Your Best Friend on HMV Japan
 Your Best Friend on Oricon

2011 singles
2011 songs
Mai Kuraki songs
Case Closed songs
Japanese-language songs
Songs written by Mai Kuraki
Song recordings produced by Daiko Nagato